Podczachy may refer to the following places in Poland:

 Podczachy, Łódź Voivodeship
 Podczachy, Masovian Voivodeship